The 1963 Oklahoma State Cowboys football team represented Oklahoma State University as a member of the Big Eight Conference during the 1963 NCAA University Division football season. Led by first-year head coach Phil Cutchin, the Cowboys compiled an overall record of 1–8 with a mark of 0–6 in conference play, placing last out of eight teams in the Big 8.

Schedule

References

Oklahoma State
Oklahoma State Cowboys football seasons
Oklahoma State Cowboys football